Cornish Blue is a type of blue cheese from Cornwall, England, United Kingdom. It is made by the Cornish Cheese Company at Upton Cross.

It has won Gold in the British Cheese Awards 2004, Best Blue & Best English Cheese 2007, Royal Bath & West Supreme Champion Cheese 2010, and was recognised in December 2010 as the winning cheese in the World Cheese Awards ahead of 2600 other entries from 26 countries.

See also

 List of Cornish cheeses
 List of British cheeses
 List of cheeses

References

Blue
Cow's-milk cheeses